Signalman is a fictional supervillain appearing in American comic books published by DC Comics. He is a member of Batman's rogues gallery.

Publication history
Signalman first appeared in Batman #112 (December 1957), and was created by Bill Finger and Sheldon Moldoff.

Fictional character biography
Phillip "Phil" Cobb was a gangster with big ideas. He came to Gotham City intent on hiring a gang of his own and making it big, only to be laughed at when he tried to recruit the gang because he had no reputation. Steaming with anger, he vowed to prove himself to Gotham's mobsters, and when he noticed how modern society was regulated by signs, signals and symbols, he found the inspiration for his criminal career. As the Signalman, he went on a spectacular crime spree using those signs and symbols as his motif.

Ultimately captured by Batman and Robin, he returned for a rematch a year later, and then switched gears as the Blue Bowman, a copycat of Green Arrow. After that, he remained unseen until 1976, when he resumed his Signalman guise in Detective Comics #466 where he actually managed to trap Batman inside the Batsignal.

In the years since then, Signalman has also been a member of the Secret Society of Super Villains and, in that capacity, did battle with the Justice League and the Justice Society.

In the pages of Identity Crisis, it is mentioned that Signalman was kidnapped by Doctor Moon and Phobia, a fact confirmed in the pages of Manhunter, which depicts his torture and seeming death via a video recording.

"One Year Later", he appears alive and is a drug-addled informant for Black Lightning.

During the "Final Crisis" storyline, Signalman appears being arrested in full costume.

In The New 52 reboot of  DC's continuity (launched in 2011), Signalman first appears as a member of the Secret Society. When Catwoman breaks out of Arkham Asylum, Signalman and Blockbuster confront Catwoman on the rooftop, which ended with Catwoman being knocked out.

During the "Trinity War" storyline, Signalman is sent with Giganta and Vandal Savage into tracking Pandora. After Pandora successfully subdues Giganta, Signalman realizes that Pandora is more parahuman than originally thought.

In 2016, DC Comics implemented another relaunch of its books called "DC Rebirth", which restored its continuity to a form much as it was prior to "The New 52". Signalman is one of the many villains taken down by Batman and Catwoman after the latter takes the former along with on an "average night" of Batman's job.

Powers and abilities
Signalman has no superhuman powers but he is a highly skilled hand-to-hand combatant. He also carries items such as a knockout-gas gun, miniature flares that cause fires, electric "sparks" capable of controlling the signals to the human brain, and a remote-control device in his belt that alters signals of an electronic nature.

Other versions
 In the Kingdom Come miniseries, there is a background character named Signalwoman. The left side of her face is completely covered in tattoos, including her shaved head (the tattoos match the symbols on the original's costume).
 In the Batman Beyond comics, an elderly, retired and reformed version of the character is murdered in a manner reminiscent of Two-Face, stabbed twice in the heart and throat. After his corpse is discovered in his apartment by the new Batman, Bruce Wayne mentions that he had gone to prison years earlier and had turned his life around upon his release.

In other media
Signalman makes minor appearances in the animated series Batman: The Brave and the Bold, voiced by an uncredited Greg Ellis.
 A variation of Blue Bowman appears in the episode "Deep Cover for Batman", voiced by James Arnold Taylor. This version is an alternate universe counterpart of Green Arrow and a member of the Injustice Syndicate led by Owlman.

See also
 List of Batman Family enemies

References

External links
 DCU Guide: Signalman
 A blog on Signalman

Comics characters introduced in 1957
DC Comics supervillains
Characters created by Bill Finger
Fictional gangsters
Characters created by Sheldon Moldoff